Ludmila Makarova (born 26 March 1957), also known as Luda Makarova, is a Russian former tennis player.

Makarova, trained at Moscow's Spartak Club, won two medals for the Soviet Union at the 1981 Summer Universiade in Bucharest and was a national Federation Cup player in 1982, helping the team reach the World Group quarter-finals.

Now living in San Diego, Makarova is married to microbiologist Mikhail Popkov and has two daughters. Her youngest daughter, Christina, played professional tennis. The family left Russia in the 1990s.

See also
List of Soviet Union Federation Cup representatives

References

External links
 
 

1957 births
Living people
Soviet female tennis players
Russian female tennis players
Russian emigrants to the United States
Universiade silver medalists for the Soviet Union
Universiade bronze medalists for the Soviet Union
Universiade medalists in tennis
Medalists at the 1981 Summer Universiade